Shoin University

Several different Japanese institutions of higher learning also contain the name Shoin.
Kobe Shoin Women's University
Osaka Shoin Women's College 
Shoin Higashi Junior Women's College